The 2008 Chatham Cup is the New Zealand's 81st knockout football competition. The final was played on 13 September at North Harbour Stadium, North Shore.

In all, 132 teams took part in the 2008 competition. Note: there is some confusion as to the round numbers. Some publications list a preliminary round, a qualification round, and four rounds proper before quarter-finals, semi-finals, and a final; others list a preliminary round and five rounds before the quarter-finals. the latter numbering system is used in this article.

The 2008 competition's final rounds were unusual for two reasons: only one of the four semi-finalists had ever previously reached the semi-finals (Dunedin Technical - the only team to have done so - won the cup in 1999), and two South Island teams reached the semi-finals for the first time since 1995. A change of venue for the final was mooted - possibly to Christchurch - had both finalists been South Island teams.

The 2008 final
In the final, 1999 Cup-winners Dunedin Technical faced finals debutants East Coast Bays in front of a crowd of some 3000 spectators at North Harbour Stadium. Technical had the better of the early stages of the match, as East Coast Bays took time to settle, but were unable to press home any advantage. By the mid-stages of the half Bays had begun to exert their dominance, particularly in the midfield area. The only goal of the match came from a long Ryan Zoghby throw-in in the 34th minute which was deflected by Technical defender Blair Scoullar into his own net.

Technical responded well to being behind, increasing the pressure on the Bays defence throughout the second half, but were unable to square the match.

The Jack Batty Memorial Cup is awarded to the player adjudged to have made to most positive impact in the Chatham Cup final. The winner of the 2008 Jack Batty Memorial Cup was Ryan Zoghby of East Coast Bays.

Results

Third round

† North Shore United won 4-0, but fielded an ineligible player. Match awarded to NZ Celtic Supporters and result amended to 2-0.
* Won on penalties by Northern (5-4)

Fourth round

* Won on penalties by Avon United (5-4)

Fifth round

Quarter-finals

Semi-finals

Final

External links
Rec.Sport.Soccer Statistics Foundation New Zealand 2008 page
Ultimatenzsoccer.com 2008 Chatham Cup page
NZPA photographs of the final

References

Chatham Cup
Chatham Cup
Chatham Cup
Chat